Balaena Valley is a gently sloping valley, filled with ice, lying east of Suspiros Bay in the western part of Joinville Island. It was surveyed by the Falkland Islands Dependencies Survey in 1953–54. The Balaena (Alexander Fairweather, master) was one of the Dundee whaling ships that visited the Joinville Island group in 1892–93. The name was applied in 1956 by the United Kingdom Antarctic Place-Names Committee and derives from association with Cape Kinnes  to the south-west; Robert Kinnes was the Dundee shipowner and merchant who equipped these ships for their Antarctic voyage.

References
 

Valleys of Graham Land
Landforms of the Joinville Island group